WiR2020 is a minor party in Germany aimed primarily at opponents of vaccinations.

Elections 
In 2021, WiR2020 stood in the Baden-Württemberg state election for 68 out of the 70 constituencies and gained 0,8% of the vote. They also stood in the Saxony-Anhalt state election having 0,2% of the vote from 1,649 votes.

References 

COVID-19 pandemic in Germany
Anti-vaccination organizations
Organizations established for the COVID-19 pandemic